The AN/CPS-4 Radar was a medium-range height-finding radar used by the United States Air Force Air Defense Command.

Developed by MIT's Radiation Laboratory, this height-finding radar was nicknamed "Beaver Tail." The radar was designed to be used in conjunction with the SCR-270 and SCR-271 search sets. The CPS-4 required six operators. This S-band radar, operating in the 2700 to 2900 MHz range, could detect targets at a distance of ninety miles. The vertical antenna was twenty feet high and five feet wide. This radar was often paired with the AN/FPS-3 search radar during the early 1950s at permanent network radar sites.

References

 AN/CPS-4 @ radomes.org
  Winkler, David F. (1997), Searching the skies: the legacy of the United States Cold War defense radar program.  Prepared for United States Air Force Headquarters Air Combat Command.

Ground radars
Military radars of the United States
Radars of the United States Air Force